Callizygaena auratus is a moth in the Zygaenidae family. It was described by Pieter Cramer in 1779 from Sri Lanka. One subspecies is recognized, C. a. nivimacula Felder & Felder, 1874.

References

A preliminary review of the classification of the zygaenid subfamily Procridinae

Moths described in 1779